Khovanshchina is a 1959 Soviet film, released the following year, directed by Vera Stroyeva and based on the eponymous opera by 19th-century Russian composer Modest Mussorgsky. For his adaptation of Mussorgsky's score, Dmitri Shostakovich was nominated for an Academy Award for Best Scoring of a Musical Picture. The music was conducted by Yevgeny Svetlanov.

Cast 
 Aleksei Krivchenya as Prince Ivan Khovansky, head of the Streltsy
 Anton Grigoriev as Prince Andrei Khovansky, son of Ivan Khovansky
 Yevgeny Kibkalo as Boyar Fyodor Shaklovity
Mark Reizen as Dosifey, leader of the Old Believers
 Kira Leonova as Marfa, an Old Believer
 Vladimir Petrov as Prince Vasily Golitsin
 Aleksei Maslennikov as Kuzka, a young strelets
 Maya Plisetskaya as Persian slave

References

External links

1960 films
1960s historical musical films
Soviet opera films
Soviet historical musical films
1960s Russian-language films
Films directed by Vera Stroyeva
Films set in the 1680s
Mosfilm films
Cultural depictions of Russian men
Cultural depictions of politicians